North Salem High School (originally Salem High School) is a public high school in Salem, Oregon, United States, founded in 1906. It was known as Salem High School until 1954.

History
Opened in 1906, the original Salem High School building was at the location of the former Meier & Frank building in downtown Salem (now a Macy's). A decision was made to move the school to a more spacious building, and in 1937, the new Salem High School building was opened on the corner of 14th and D street. The new building was a project of the Public Works Administration, and at the time of its founding was on the fringes of developed Salem. The school's name was changed in 1954 to North Salem High School when South Salem High School opened that year. Over the years, many additions have been made to the building, with the latest addition, the West Wing, being completed in 2001. In 2019, North Salem High School began construction on new gyms and classrooms.

Academics
Like many Marion County schools, North Salem High School has historically had a high dropout rate, regularly exceeding the state average. During the 2001–02 school year, the dropout rate stood at 29.83%. This, however, has been improving steadily since 1997, when the dropout rate was 39.90%.

In 2018, 68% of the school's seniors received a high school diploma. Of 441 students, 299 graduated and 106 dropped out. North Salem's test scores are below state averages, although they have been improving slowly. In 2017–18, North Salem finished with 62% meeting English standards, 32% in Math, and 30% in Science, all of which are below the state average in each respective category.

Music
North Salem has been nationally recognized by the GRAMMY Foundation as a "Grammy Signature School" multiple times.

In 2003, the Marching Band won the Northwest Marching Band Circuit, taking their number one ranking among Washington, Oregon, Southern Idaho, Northern California, and Western Nevada marching bands. In 2005, the band tied with South Salem High School to win the OSAA 4A State Band Championship.

State championships
 Boys' cross country: 1949, 1952, 1953
 Boys' basketball: 1920, 1925, 1926, 1933, 1939, 1940, 1950
 Baseball: 1967
 Boys' golf: 1953
 Boys' tennis: 1953
 Boys' track & field: 1927
 Girls' Track & Field: 1997(4A), 2019(5A)

(tie) Grant (11-0-1). Multnomah Stadium, Portland
North Salem (7-1-2 1963

Notable alumni

 Staryl C. Austin, U.S. Air Force general
 Lute Barnes, former MLB player for New York Mets
Rocky Gale, Major League Baseball player, San Diego Padres
Edith Starrett Green, United States Representative 1955-74
 Elizabeth Halseth, Nevada state senator
 Avry Holmes, basketball player
 Mark Hatfield, Governor of Oregon 1959–67, U.S. Senator 1967–97
 Frank Herbert, author of Dune
 Jed Lowrie (born 1984), Major League Baseball player, Oakland Athletics
 Leonard Stone (born Leonard Steinbock), actor

References

External links
 Historic images of Salem High School and related images from Salem Public Library

Educational institutions established in 1906
High schools in Salem, Oregon
Public Works Administration in Oregon
1906 establishments in Oregon
Public high schools in Oregon